The 2019 Super2 Series was an Australian motor racing competition for Supercars, a support series to the 2019 Supercars Championship. It was the twentieth running of the Supercars Development Series, the second tier of competition in Supercars racing.

Bryce Fullwood won the championship with one round to spare in the MW Motorsport prepared Nissan Altima L33.

Entries
The following teams and drivers competed in the 2019 championship:

Team changes
 Brad Jones Racing scaled back to a single-car team, after having previously run three cars.
 Image Racing formed a partnership with Erebus Motorsport, expanding to a two-car operation.
 Kali Motorsport withdrew from the championship citing a lack of sponsorship, but retained its entry and cars with a view to re-joining the series in the future.
 Matt Chahda Motorsport switched from running a Holden VF Commodore to a Ford FG X Falcon.
 Paul Morris Motorsport withdrew from the championship to focus on its Super3 Series entry.
 Triple Eight Race Engineering returned to the Super2 series for the first time since 2013, entering two VF Commodores.

Driver changes
 Paul Dumbrell retired from the Super2 Series at the end of 2018.
 The Grand Tour test driver Abbie Eaton made her Super2 début with Matt Stone Racing.
 Reigning Super3 Series champion Tyler Everingham graduated to the Super2 Series with MW Motorsport.
 Dean Fiore moved to Eggleston Motorsport on a 2 round deal, replacing Nathan Morcom.
 Bryce Fullwood returned to MW Motorsport after racing with Matt Stone Racing in 2018.
 Zane Goddard left Brad Jones Racing and joined MW Motorsport.
 Kurt Kostecki and Brenton Grove left Kostecki Brothers Racing and Grove Racing respectively to join Triple Eight Race Engineering.
 2018 Aussie Racing Cars champion Joel Heinrich made his Super2 début with Matt Stone Racing.
 Garry Jacobson and Macauley Jones left the series as they graduated to the Supercars Championship, with Kelly Racing and Tim Blanchard Racing respectively.
 Porsche Carrera Cup driver Dylan O'Keeffe made his Super2 début with Garry Rogers Motorsport, replacing 2018 champion Chris Pither.
 Aussie Racing Cars race winner Justin Ruggier made his Super2 début with Eggleston Motorsport.
 Ashley Walsh returned to the series for the first time since 2014, driving for Matt Stone Racing.

Mid-season changes
 Abbie Eaton withdrew from the championship following the Adelaide round due to sponsorship issues.
 Joel Heinrich withdrew from the championship following the Barbagallo round due to sponsorship issues.
 Brodie Kostecki withdrew from the championship following the Barbagallo round to focus on his, and Kostecki Brothers Racing's Enduro Cup début.
 Tim Blanchard made a one-off appearance for Brad Jones Racing in Townsville in preparation for the Enduro Cup.
 Mason Barbera withdrew from the championship following the Queensland round due to sponsorship issues.
 Jake Kostecki withdrew from the championship following the Queensland round to focus on his, and Kostecki Brothers Racing's Enduro Cup début.
 David Russell made a one-off appearance for Matt Stone Racing at the Bathurst Round.
 Jack Perkins withdrew from the Bathurst round due to illness.

Calendar
The calendar for the 2019 championship consisted of seven rounds:

Calendar changes
 The category returned to Queensland Raceway for the first time since 2015. The Symmons Plains round was removed from the schedule.

Results and standings

Season summary

Points system
Points were awarded in each race as follows.

Series standings

References

External links
 

Supercars Development Series
Super2 Series